Baphiastrum is a genus of flowering plants in the legume family, found in west Africa. It belongs to the subfamily Faboideae. Baphiastrum was traditionally assigned to the tribe Sophoreae; however, recent molecular phylogenetic analyses reassigned Baphiastrum to the Baphieae tribe.

Species
Baphiastrum comprises the following species:
 Baphiastrum boonei (De Wild.) Vermoesen
 Baphiastrum brachycarpum Harms 
 Baphiastrum calophylla (Harms) De Wild.
 Baphiastrum elegans (Lester-Garland) De Wild.
 Baphiastrum klainei (De Wild.) De Wild.

 Baphiastrum pilosum (Baill.) De Wild.
 Baphiastrum spathaceum (Hook. f.) Staner
 Baphiastrum vermeuleni (De Wild.) De Wild.

Species names with uncertain taxonomic status
The status of the following species is unresolved:
 Baphiastrum bequaerti De Wild.
 Baphiastrum claessensi De Wild.
 Baphiastrum spathacea Staner

References

Baphieae
Fabaceae genera